Alberta Culture Days (formerly Alberta Arts Days) is a three-day, province wide celebration of the arts and culture. The first three years of Alberta Arts Days occurred during the third Friday, Saturday and Sunday of September before shifting to align with the pan-Canadian Culture Days. The purpose of Alberta Culture Days is to showcase the province's artists, art organizations and cultural industries, encourage Albertans and its visitors to engage in the arts, and promote the importance of arts and culture as part of a prosperous and vibrant province.

Background
The first Alberta Arts Days occurred in 1974 during a three-day arts celebration in Red Deer, Alberta and coincided with the creation of Alberta's first Ministry of Culture, but was not implemented into an annual event.
In 2008, Alberta Arts Days was reinitiated by the province's Ministry of Culture and Community Spirit. Governed by The Spirit of Alberta, Alberta's cultural policy, Alberta Arts Days helps the Ministry achieve one of its stated goals to "Ensure Albertans, throughout the province, have access to a wide range of cultural experiences and opportunities." Albertans are encouraged to plan arts related events during the weekend, while others incorporate an artistic element to a project or event that is already planned.
 
The event's name was changed to Alberta Culture Days in 2012.

References

External links
 
Arts festivals in Alberta
1974 establishments in Alberta
Recurring events established in 1974